Monir Hossain (born 27 January 1985) is a Bangladeshi cricketer who has played at First-class, List A and Twenty20 level. He is a left-handed batsman and slow left arm orthodox bowler. He has represented Barisal Division and Sylhet Division in First-class and List A cricket. He has played with Duronto Rajshahi and the Barisal Bulls in the Bangladesh Premier League.

Career
Monir made his First-class and List A debuts for Barisal Division in February 2006, against Rajshahi Division and Chittagong Division respectively. After playing for Sylhet Division in 2009, he returned to Barisal Division in 2010.

Monir was selected by Duronto Rajshahi for the 2012–13 Bangladesh Premier League. In October 2016, he was selected by the Barisal Bulls for the 2016–17 Bangladesh Premier League draft.

Playing for Barisal Division against Rajshahi Division in the National Cricket League in November 2018, Monir finished the Rajshahi first innings by taking a hat-trick, dismissing all three victims leg before wicket.

In November 2019, Monir was selected to play for the Sylhet Thunder in the 2019–20 Bangladesh Premier League.

References

Bangladeshi cricketers
Barisal Division cricketers
Rajshahi Royals cricketers
Living people
Prime Bank Cricket Club cricketers
Victoria Sporting Club cricketers
1985 births
People from Barisal